Sustainable fashion (also known as eco-fashion) is a term describing products, processes, activities, and people (policymakers, brands, consumers) aiming to achieve a carbon-neutral fashion industry built on equality, social justice, animal welfare, and ecological integrity. Sustainable fashion concerns more than addressing fashion textiles or products. It addresses the entire process in which clothing is produced, consumed and disposed: who, what, how, when, where and the expected useful life of the product before entering landfill. The sustainable movement looks to combat the large carbon footprint that fast fashion has created by reducing the environmental impact of fashion such as air pollution, water pollution and climate change.

In 2020, it was found that an approach of voluntary self-directed reform of textile manufacturing supply chains to reduce the environmental impact of fashion by large companies was largely unsuccessful. Measures to reform fashion beyond greenwashing needed to involve policies for the creation and enforcement of standardized certificates along with related import controls, subsidies and interventions such as eco-tariffs.

Background and history 
The origin of sustainable fashion movement is intertwined with the modern environmental movement, with the publication in 1962 of the book Silent Spring by American biologist Rachel Carson. Carson's book exposed the serious and widespread pollution associated with the use of agricultural chemicals, a theme still relevant to the environmental and social impact of fashion today. The decades which followed saw humans' impact on the environment more systematically investigated, notably the effects of industrial activity. New concepts were introduced for discussing these effects, such as sustainable development, a term coined in 1987 by the Brundtland Report.

In the early 1990s, roughly coinciding with the 1992 United Nations Conference on Environment and Development, popularly known as the Rio Earth Summit, 'green issues' (as they were called at the time) made their way into fashion and textiles publications. These publications featured well-known companies such as Patagonia and ESPRIT, who's founders Yvon Chouinard and Doug Tompkins, were outdoorsmen who witnessed the environmental harm of overproduction and overconsumption. Doug Tompkins and Yvon Chouinard were early to note that exponential growth and consumption are not sustainable. In the late 1980s, they brought environmental concerns into their business models, commissioning research into the impact of fibres used in their respective companies. For Patagonia, this resulted in a lifecycle assessment of four fibres: cotton, wool, nylon, and polyester. For ESPRIT, the focus was on cotton—representing 90% of their production at the time—and finding better alternatives to it. A primary focus on materials' provenance, impact and selection, fibre and fabric processing is still the norm in sustainable fashion 30 years on.

The principles of 'green' or 'eco' fashion, was based on the philosophy of the deep ecologists Arne Næss, Fritjof Capra, and Ernest Callenbach, and design theorist Victor Papanek. This imperative is also linked to a feminist understanding of human-nature relationships, interconnectedness and “ethics of care” as advocated by Carolyn Merchant, Suzi Gablik, Vandana Shiva, and Carol Gilligan.

The legacy of the early work of Patagonia and ESPRIT continues to shape the conversation around fashion sustainability today. In 1990, ESPRIT placed an ad in Utne Reader making a plea for responsible consumption, and ESPRIT and Patagonia co-funded the first organic cotton conference held in 1991 in Visalia, California, aimed at broadening the movement to include many fashion brands.

In 1992, the ESPRIT e-collection based on the Eco Audit guide by the Elmwood Institute, was developed by head designer Lynda Grose and launched at retail. In 2011 the brand Patagonia ran an ad and a PR campaign called "Don't Buy This Jacket" with a picture of Patagonia merchandise. This message was intended to encourage people to consider the effect that consumption has on the environment, to purchase only what they need.

In parallel with industry, research around sustainable fashion has been in development since the early 1990s, with the field now having its own history, dynamics, politics, practices, sub-movements and evolution of analytical and critical language. The field is broad in scope, including technical projects that seek to improve the resource efficiency of existing operations, the consideration of brands and designers working within currently understood frameworks as well as those which look to fundamentally re-imagine the fashion industry, including the growth logic.

In 2019, a group of researchers formed the Union for Concerned Researchers in Fashion (UCRF) to advocate for radical and coordinated research activity commensurate with the challenges of biodiversity loss and climate change. In the fall of 2019, the UCRF received the North Star Award at the Green Carpet Fashion Awards during Milan Fashion Week.

Purpose 
Adherents of the sustainable fashion movement believe that the fashion industry has a clear opportunity to act differently, pursuing profit and growth while also creating new value and deeper wealth for society and therefore for the world economy. The goal of sustainable fashion is to create flourishing ecosystems and communities through its activity. The movement believes that clothing companies ought to place environmental, social, and ethical improvements on management's agenda. This may include: increasing the value of local production and products; prolonging the lifecycle of materials; increasing the value of timeless garments; reducing the amount of waste; and reducing the harm to the environment as a result of production and consumption. Another goal is to educate people to practice environmentally friendly consumption by promoting the "green consumer", which can allow for the company itself to gain more support and a larger following.

Green consumerism is the shift in consumer behavior attitudes advocating for the efficient use of energy, which ultimately helps in saving money, reducing utility bills, lowering emissions of greenhouse gas, and enabling economies to meet the growing energy demands. In recent years there has been an increase in research centered around consumer reactions to the advent of green products within fast fashion. Critics doubt the effectiveness that this has, but companies have already begun slowly transitioning their business models to fit a more eco-friendly and sustainable future. Thus the industry has to change its basic premise for profit, yet this is slow coming as it requires a large shift in business practices, models and tools for assessment. This became apparent in the discussions following the Burberry report of the brand burning unsold goods worth around £28.6m (about $37.8 million) in 2018, exposing not only overproduction and subsequent destruction of unsold stock as a normal business practice, but behavior amongst brands that actively undermine a sustainable fashion agenda.

The challenge for making fashion more sustainable often requires systematic reinvention, and this call for action is not new. The UCRF has argued that the industry focus remains the same ideas originally mooted in the late 1980s and early 1990s. The Union observes, "so far, the mission of sustainable fashion has been an utter failure and all small and incremental changes have been drowned by an explosive economy of extraction, consumption, waste and continuous labor abuse."

A frequently concern of those working in the area of sustainable fashion is whether the field itself is an oxymoron. This reflects the seemingly irreconcilable possibility of bringing together fashion (understood as constant change, and tied to business models based on continuous replacement of goods) and sustainability (understood as continuity and resourcefulness). The apparent paradox dissolves if fashion is seen more broadly, as a process not only aligned to expansionist business models and consumption, but instead as mechanism that leads to more engaged ways of living.

Temporal concerns related to fashion 
Fashion is, per definition, a phenomenon related to time: a popular expression in a certain time and context. This also affects the perception of what is and should be made more sustainable – if fashion should be "fast" or "slow"—or if it should be more exclusive or inclusive. Like much other designs, the objects of fashion exist in the inter-zone between desire and discard along a temporal axis, between the shimmering urge towards life and the thermodynamic fate of death. As noted by cultural theorist Brian Thill, "waste is every object, plus time."

When it comes down to the garments themselves, their durability depends on their use and "metabolism"—certain garments are made to withstand long use (ex. outdoor and hiking wear, winter jackets) whereas other garments have a quicker turn-around (ex. a party top). This means some garments have properties and a use-life that could be made more durable, whereas others should be compostable or recyclable for quicker disintegration. Some garments age well and acquire a patina and a romantic enchantment not unlike the wonder, fascination and grandeur of historical ruins, whereas the derelict and discarded rags of last season is an eyesore and nuisance; the first connotes a majesty of taste, whereas the second is the underclass of waste.

"Fast fashion" 
One of the most apparent reasons for the current unsustainable condition of the fashion system is related to the temporal aspects of fashion; the continuous stream of new goods onto the market, or what is popularly called "fast fashion." The term fast fashion is used to refer to the fast paced production of goods at an unethical level which often has a negative impact on the environment. As a way to conform to the latest fashion styles and keep consumers wanting new garments, current fast fashion trends pre-suppose selling clothing in large quantities. Due to fast fashion being affordable and able to keep up with the trends, there has been an increase in apparel consumption. Consumption has risen to 62 million tonnes annually and is projected to reach 102 million tonnes by 2030. This type of fashion is produced in vast quantities with low quality materials and are sold through chains such as H&M, Zara, Forever21, Shein, etc. A popular fast-fashion retailer called Shein which is most notably advertised on social media platform TikTok, is one of the most visited fast-fashion websites in the world and ships to 220 countries, however, many people have begun to question how ethical and sustainable Shein is as it is responsible for about 706 billion kilograms of greenhouse gases in 2015 from the production of polyester textiles and makes up for hundreds of gallons of water being used for one garment. In January 2021, Shein offered over 121,000 garments made from polyester, making up 61% of their clothing total. The fashion industry has a value of three trillion dollars. It is two percent of the world's gross domestic product (GDP) - the total monetary or market value of all the finished goods and services produced within a country's borders in a specific time period. Out of the three trillion dollars, the majority is made of fast fashion.

However, the "fast" aspect of consumption is primarily a problem for the environment when done on a massive scale. As long as fast conspicuous consumption was reserved to the rich, the global impact was not reaching public attention or seen as a problem. That is, "fast" shopping sprees of haute couture is not seen as a problem, rather it is celebrated (for example in movies such as Pretty Woman), whereas when people with less means shop fast fashion, it is seen as unethical and a problem. Today, the speed of fast fashion is common across the whole industry as exclusive fashion replicates the fast fashion chains with continuous releases of collections and product drops: the quality of a garment does not necessarily translate to a slower pace of consumption and waste. These releases are only exasperated by the acceleration of fashion trends. As micro-trends are only lasting an average of 3 years, the demand for clothes has also accelerated.

Fast fashion has negative effects on the environment and is unethical in terms of production. In order to make clothing fast enough to keep up with the changing fashion trends, the clothes are produced in harmful ways. "Fast" clothing is made with synthetic fibers as opposed to natural fibers. The synthetic fibers are made using the Earth's fossil fuels. Almost sixty percent of clothes are made this way. Since people spend so much money on these types of clothes and purchase them so frequently, landfills are filling up quickly. Over sixty percent of clothes made every year end up in landfills as consumer waste, and almost twenty percent of the world's waste is constituted by fashion products. 
Therefore, because fast fashion frequently introduces new collections, consumer consumption increases. Consequently, leading consumers to view low-cost apparel as disposable since there are continuous releases of products. Production of these types of clothing is also commonly exploitative, with most factories that produce "fast" clothing employing workers on low wages in exploitative environments. Workers from Shein reported making as little as 35 cents per garment produced, as well as operating on 18-hour workdays with 1 day off per month. Exploitative fast fashion production is prevalent in countries like China, Bangladesh and Vietnam. Hard labor was always around in the fashion industry dating back to when slave labor helped factories gather their materials. People making these clothes today suffer from harsh working conditions, low wages, and risks to health and safety.

"Slow" fashion 
Slow fashion can be seen as an alternative approach against fast fashion, based on principles of the slow food movement. Characteristics of sustainable fashion match the philosophies of "slow fashion" in that emotional, ecological and ethical qualities are favored over uniform and bland convenience with minimal friction. It requires a changed infrastructure and a reduced through-put of goods. Categorically, slow fashion is neither business-as-usual nor just involving design classics. Nor is it production-as-usual but with long lead times. Slow fashion is a vision of the fashion sector built from a different starting point. Slow fashion is a fashion concept that reflects a perspective, which respects human living conditions, biological, cultural diversity and scarce global resources and creates unique, personalized products.

The term Slow Fashion came about quite organically. It was coined by Kate Fletcher of the Centre for Sustainable Fashion, following the phenomena of the slow food movement. As with the slow food movement, Fletcher saw a need for a slower pace in the fashion industry.

Slow fashion challenges growth fashion's obsession with mass-production and globalized style. It becomes a guardian of diversity and changes the power relations between fashion creators and consumers, therefore forging new relationships and trust that are only possible at smaller scales. It fosters a heightened state of awareness of the design process and its impacts on resource flows, workers, communities, and ecosystems.

Slow fashion often consists of durable products, traditional production techniques, or design concepts that strive to be season-less or last aesthetically and materially for longer periods of time. The impact of slowness aims to affect many points of the production chain. For workers in the textile industry in developing countries, slow fashion means higher wages. For end-users, slow fashion means that the goods are designed and manufactured with greater care and high-quality products. From an environmental point of view, it means that there are less clothing and industrial waste that is removed from use following transient trends. Emphasis is put on durability; emotionally, materially, aesthetically, and/or through services that prolong the use-life of garments. New ideas and product innovations are constantly redefining slow fashion, so using a static, single definition would ignore the evolving nature of the concept.

Examples of stability of expression over long times are abundant in the history of dress, not least in ethnic or folk dress, ritual or coronation robes, clerical dress, or the uniforms of the Vatican Guard. The emphasis on slowness in branding is thus an approach that is specific for a niche in the market (such as Western-educated middle-class) that has since the 1990s become dominated by "fast" models. One of the earliest brands that gained global fame with an explicit focus on slow fashion, the Anglo-Japanese brand People Tree, embraces the concept of ethical trade, manufactures all products in accordance with ethical commerce standards, and supports local producers and craftsmen in developing countries. The People Tree brand is known as the first fashion company to receive the World Fair Trade Organization product label in 2013, demonstrating their dedication to fair trade and the environment.

The concept of slow fashion is however not without its controversies, as the imperative of slowness is a mandate emerging from a position of privilege. To stop consuming "fast fashion" strikes against low-income consumers whose only means to access trends is through cheap and accessible goods. Those who are already having a high position in society can afford to slow down and cement their status and position, while those on their way up resent being told to stay at the lower rungs of the status hierarchy. "The prestige of slowness allows a cultural signifier for those already have social positions to preserve, and have time and money to take it easy and enjoy the pleasures of reflection and meditate over their moral superiority."

Garment use and lifespan 
The environmental impact of fashion also depends on how much and how long a garment is used. With the fast fashion trend, garments tend to be used half as much as compared to 15 years ago. This is due to the inferior quality of fabrics used but also a result of a significant increase in collections that are being released by the fashion industry. Typically, a garment used daily over years has less impact than a garment used once to then be quickly discarded. Studies have shown that the washing and drying process for pair of classic jeans is responsible for almost two-thirds of the energy consumed through the whole of the jeans' life, and for underwear about 80% of total energy use comes from laundry processes. The dyeing process also contributes close to 15%-20% of wastewater. For this reason, innovative techniques are being introduced to reduce energy and water consumption, such as utilizing CO2 in the dyeing process. Thus, use and wear practices affect the lifecycles of garments and needs to be addressed for larger systemic impact.

However, there is a significant difference between making a product last from making a long-lasting product. The quality of the product must reflect the appropriate fit into its lifecycle. Certain garments of quality can be repaired and cultivated with emotional durability. Low-quality products that deteriorate rapidly are not as suitable to be "enchanted" with emotional bonds between user and product. It is important to notice that choosing and promoting "emotional bonds" with consumer objects is an endeavor more easily done under circumstances of excess, as the needy have no other option than to keep and care for their belongings.

As highlighted in the research of Irene Maldini, slowing down (in the sense of keeping garments longer) does not necessarily translate into lower volumes of purchased units. Maldini's studies expose how slow fashion, in the sense of long-lasting use phase of garments, tends to indicate that garments stay in the wardrobe longer, stored or hoarded, but does not mean fewer resources are used in producing garments. Thus, slowness comes to mean wardrobes with more lasting products, but the consumption volume and in-flow into the wardrobe/storage stay the same.

Concerns

Environmental 
The fashion industry has a disastrous impact on the environment. In fact, it is the second largest polluter in the world, just after the oil industry. And, the environmental damage is increasing as the industry grows.

The textiles and fashion industries are amongst the leading industries that affect the environment negatively. One of the industries that greatly jeopardize environmental sustainability is the textiles and fashion industry, which thus also bears great responsibilities. Globalization has made it possible to produce clothing at increasingly lower prices, prices so low, and collections shifting so fast, that many consumers consider fashion to be disposable. However, fast, and thus disposable, fashion adds to pollution and generates environmental hazards, in production, use, and disposal.

Putting the environmental perspective at the center, rather than the logic of the industry, is thus an urgent concern if fashion is to become more sustainable. The Earth Logic fashion research action plan argues for "putting the health and survival of our planet earth and consequently the future security and health of all species including humans, before industry, business, and economic growth." In making this argument the Earth Logic plan explicitly connects the global fashion system with the 2018 Intergovernmental Panel on Climate Change (IPCC) Special Report on Global Warming of 1.5 °C.

Furthermore, the Earth Logic fashion research action plan sets out a range of possible areas for work in a sustainable fashion that scientific and research evidence suggests are the most likely to deliver a change of the scale and pace needed to respond to challenges like climate change. Earth Logic's point of departure is that the planet, and its people, must be put first, before profit. It replaces the logic of economic growth, which is arguably the single largest factor limiting change towards sustainable fashion, with the logic that puts earth at its center.

Environmental hazards 
The clothing industry has one of the highest impacts on the planet. Cotton requires approximately 15,000 liters of water to grow for a pair of jeans. High water usage, pollution from chemical treatments used in dyeing and preparation and the disposal of large amounts of unsold clothing through incineration or landfill deposits are hazardous to the environment. There is a growing water scarcity, the current usage level of fashion materials (79 billion cubic meters annually) is very concerning because textile production mostly takes place in areas of fresh water stress. Only around 20% of clothing is recycled or reused, huge amounts of fashion product end up as waste in landfills or are incinerated. It has been estimated that in the UK alone around 350,000 tons of clothing ends up as landfill every year. According to Earth Pledge, a non-profit organization committed to promoting and supporting sustainable development, "At least 8,000 chemicals are used to turn raw materials into textiles and 25% of the world's pesticides are used to grow non-organic cotton. This causes irreversible damage to people and the environment, and still two thirds of a garment's carbon footprint will occur after it is purchased." The average American throws away nearly 70 pounds of clothing per year.

Microfibers 
There is increasing concern that microfibers from synthetic and cellulosic  fabrics are polluting the earths waters through the process of laundering. Microfibers are tiny threads that are shed from fabric. These microfibers are too small to be captured in wastewater treatment plants filtration systems and they end up entering our natural water systems and as a result, contaminating our food chain. One study found that 34.8% of Microplastics found in oceans come from the textile and clothing industry and the majority of them were made of polyester, polyethylene, acrylic, and elastane; but a study off the coast of the UK and US by the Plymouth Marine Laboratory in May 2020 suggested there are at least double the number of particles as previously thought. Eliminating synthetic materials used in clothing products can prevent harmful synthetics and microfibers from ending up in the natural environment. While some clothing companies and NGOs support the use of washing bags to filter out microfibers in washing machines and thus reduce microfiber release, microfibers are also shed during wear and disposal.

"Fossil fashion" 
In February 2021, Changing Markets Foundation released a report on the fashion industry's dependence on oil extraction. The report analyses the current production model across the fashion industry is dependent on massive fossil-fuel extraction to fuel the production of fibers. The report spotlights how the production of the most popular fibers, primarily polyester, is reliant on oil extraction. Production of polyester has grown ninefold since the 1970s, and is the fastest growing component in fashion production. The popularity of polyester is due to its low price, but also the fiber's flexibility as a material. The report suggests, synthetic fibers in the textile industry currently accounts for 1.35% of global oil consumption, and this is projected to more than double in the coming years: "BP's energy scenario presumes plastic production will account for 95% of future growth in demand for oil demand, while the International Energy Agency (IEA) predicts petrochemicals will represent up to 50% of growth in oil demand by 2050 and 4% in the projected growth of gas demand." (p. 8)

Social 
One of the main social issues related to fashion concerns labor. Since the Triangle Shirtwaist Factory fire in 1911, labor rights in the fashion industry has been at the center of this issue. The 2013 Savar building collapse at Rana Plaza, where 1138 people died, put the spotlight once again on the lack of transparency, poor working conditions and hazards in fashion production. Attention is increasingly being placed on labour rights violations in other parts of the whole fashion product lifecycle from textile production and processing, retail and distribution and modeling to the recycling of textiles. Whilst the majority of fashion and textiles are produced in Asia, Central America, Turkey, North Africa, the Caribbean and Mexico, there is still production across Europe where exploitative working conditions are also found such as in Leicester in the UK Midlands and Central and Eastern Europe.

The fashion industry benefits from racial, class and gender inequalities. These inequalities and pressure from brands and retailers in the form of low prices and short lead times contribute to exploitative working conditions and low wages. Also "local" production, such as garments labeled as "Made in Italy" are engaged in global sourcing of labor and worker exploitation, bypassing unions and social welfare contracts.

The number of workers employed in textiles, clothing, and footwear is unknown due to the differences in statistical measures. It is generally accepted that at least 25 million people, the majority women, work in garment manufacture and up to 300 million in cotton alone.

The environmental impact of fashion also affects communities located close to production sites. There is little easily accessible information about these impacts, but it is known that water and land pollution from toxic chemicals used to produce and dye fabrics and have serious negative consequences for the people living near factories.

The social costs of fast fashion are left on the laborers working long hours to mass produce the clothing. They bear the weight of the fast fashion industry as they work through environmental health hazards and cheap pay that does not compensate for the work, they put in. This is a big reason why slow fashion is becoming so desirable. Unlike fast fashion, it places a big importance on ethical conduct and caring for people working throughout the supply chain.

Transparency 
Supply chain transparency has been a recurring controversy for the fashion industry, especially since the Rana Plaza accident. The issue has been pushed by many labor organizations, not least Clean Clothes Campaign and Fashion Revolution. Over the last years, over 150 major brands including Everlane, Filippa K, and H&M have answered by publicizing information about their factories online. Every year, Fashion Revolution publishes a Fashion Transparency Index which rates the world's largest brands and retailers according to how much information they disclose about their suppliers, supply chain policies and practices, and social and environmental impact. The top scorers of the 2019 Fashion Transparency Index included Adidas, Reebok, Patagonia, and H&M. The high place of several fast fashion retailers caused controversy regarding the parameters used for such rankings.

Diversity and inclusion 
In addition, fashion companies are criticized for the lack of size, age, physical ability, gender and racial diversity of models used in photo shoots and catwalks. A more radical and systemic critique of social inequality in fashion concerns the exclusion and aesthetic supremacy inherent and accentuated through fashion that still remains unquestioned under the current environmentally focused discourse on sustainable fashion.

While social "inclusivity" has become almost a norm amongst brands marketing ethical and sustainable fashion, the norm for what is considered a "beautiful" and "healthy" body keeps narrowing down under what researchers have called the current "wellness syndrome." With the positive thinking of inclusivity, the assumption is that a consumer can be whatever he or she wants to be, and thus if the person is not living up to the ideals it is the person's own fault. This optimism hides the diktat of aesthetic wellness, which turns inclusion into an obligation to look good and be dressed in fashionable clothes, a "democratic" demand for aesthetic as well as ethical perfection, as argued by philosopher Heather Widdows.

Global 
The impact of fashion across the planet is unevenly distributed. Whereas much of the benefits of cheap and accessible clothes targets and benefits the socially mobile classes in metropolitan areas in the Global North, developing countries take a much higher proportion of the negative impact from the fashion system in terms of waste, pollution, and ecological injustices.

Global North 
Across consumer societies, primarily located in the Global North, the current focus is on solutions related to "reduce, reuse, recycle," which are primarily promoted through brand initiatives. While this approach puts focus on the abundance of cheap and accessible goods, it fails to address the uneven global impact of the fashion system. The fashion situation differs widely between consumer societies and developing economies. The push for affecting overconsumption not only pushes responsibility for systemic issues onto the individual, but it also primarily positions fashion in a Western consumerism context, and puts Euro-centric models of status, individualism, and consumerism as universal models for social life and aspirations.

Asian 
China has emerged as the largest exporter of fast fashion, accounting for 30% of world apparel exports. However, some Chinese workers make as little as 12–18 cents per hour working in poor conditions. Each year Americans purchase approximately 1 billion garments made in China. Today's biggest factories and mass scale of apparel production emerged from two developments in history. The first involved the opening up of China and Vietnam in the 1980s to private and foreign capital and investments in the creation of export-oriented manufacturing of garments, footwear, and plastics, part of a national effort to boost living standards, embrace modernity, and capitalism. Second, the retail revolution within the U.S. (example Wal-Mart, Target, Nike) and Western Europe, where companies no longer manufactured but rather contracted out their production and transformed instead into key players in design, marketing, and logistics, introducing many new different product lines manufactured in foreign-owned factories in China. It is the convergence of these two phenomena that has led to the largest factories in history from apparels to electronics. In contemporary global supply chains, it is the retailers and branders who have had the most power in establishing arrangements and terms of production, not factory owners.  Fierce global competition in the garment industry translates into poor working conditions for many laborers in developing nations. Developing countries aim to become a part of the world's apparel market despite poor working conditions and low pay. Countries such as Cambodia and Bangladesh export large amounts of clothing into the United States every year.

Economic 
At the heart of the controversy concerning "fast fashion" lies the acknowledgment that the "problem" of unsustainable fashion is that cheap, accessible, and on-trend clothes have become available to people of poorer means. This means more people across the world have adopted the consumption habits that in the mid-20th century were still reserved for the rich. To put it differently, the economic concern of fashion is that poor people, or populations in developing economies, now have access to updating their wardrobes as often as the rich, or consumers in Western economies. That is, "fast" fashion is only a problem when poor people engage in it. In alignment with this, the blame for the proliferation of poor-quality, high-quantity and cheap fashion is often put on poorer consumers.

The economic concerns of fashion also mean many of the sustainable solutions to fashion, such as buying high-quality goods to last longer, are not accessible to people with fewer means. From an economic perspective, sustainability thus remains a moralizing issue of educated classes teaching the less educated "responsible consumption," and a debate that mainly concerns promoting frugality and austerity to those with fewer means. It is seen as an opportunity by businesses that allow the resale of luxury goods.

The distribution of value within the fashion industry is another economic concern, with garment workers and textile farmers and workers receiving low wages and prices.

Business models for sustainable fashion 
In order to promote more sustainable forms of consumption, there is a multitude of emerging business models that challenge the prevalent ready-to-wear model.

Circular fashion models 
A number of emerging business models go under the name of "circular fashion," inspired by the circular economy. While there are many models under development, some are gaining more traction. Much of the work on circular fashion builds on ideas and initiatives explored in the 1990s and onwards, by scholars such as Lynda Grose, Kate Fletcher, Rebecca Earley, Mathilda Tham, and Timo Rissanen, especially the thinking around the "metabolism" of garments and wardrobes, "zero waste" production, and the focus on the whole life cycle of garments. The popular terminology around circular fashion, reached the mainstream through a report that has come to define the field, the 2017 "A New Textile Economy: Redesigning Fashion's Future" by the Ellen MacArthur Foundation.

The "cradle-to-cradle" model, a circular system named after the influential 2002 book with the same name by German chemist Michael Braungart and US architect William McDonough has been a popular inspiration amongst proponents of circular fashion, it is not easy to achieve. Most textile fibers in consumer fashion are amalgamations of various materials to achieve flexible or aesthetic properties, and thus not optimal for circular reproduction. Industrially shredded fibers often need addition of new materials to achieve elasticity or durability. Up until now, most companies contributing to circular fashion are either mechanical or chemical textile recyclers such as Lenzing, Recover Textile Systems, Renewcell, Evrnu, Spinnova or Infinited Fiber Company. Although all work with textile waste as their raw material, it is often from pre-consumer origins as it is easier to sort and process. More recently, some industry initiatives to develop and scale pre-consumer and post-consumer textile recycling have been emerging around the globe, particularly as a response to new legislation. On March 30, The European Commission published the EU Strategy for Sustainable and Circular Textiles, a new strategy that lays out key principles to drive change in the textiles industry. The European Commission’s vision of the future of the textiles industry in Europe lays on several pillars that include recycled textiles, ecodesigns, waste management, transparency, labelling, microplastics and extended producer responsibility (EPR).

Biomimicry, natural cycles, and processes 
Biomimicry suggests a perspective emphasizing the "Wisdom of Nature" where the industry looks into materials in tune with natural cycles. Biomimicry replicates the cycles of nature, seeking to infinitely reuse materials to make commerce compatible with nature. Fashion from the viewpoint of biomimicry tries to make fashion work as a sustainable ecosystem, aligning with natural systems in harmony with the biosphere. Materials should be bio-compatible, combining biodegradable fibers with processes of fermentation and gasification, or materials that have been seen as waste could act as a more sustainable method to making new clothing. Materials that can mitigate negative impacts from the industry. Whereas some biomimicry is about inventing new fibers and processes inspired by natural processes, biomimicry also connnotes traditional vegan and fossil-free materials, materials processed from the normal cycles of the natural environment, fibers "forgotten" or disregarded in agricultural business, or fibers made from regenerative agriculture, permaculture or sustainable techniques from indigenous cultures.

Rental and sharing models 
Rental models are gaining popularity across the industry, a model that has traditionally been used in attire for masquerades or special events, such as weddings. The idea is that sharing garments ultimately lowers the volume of new purchases and disposal of clothing, which means less waste. Rent the Runway is a company building on the "Rent a Closet" approach to consumption, where a consumer leases a garment instead of purchasing it. Fashion rental is a model expected to grow over 10% annually until 2027 across the fashion industry, thus also increasing sales (and expected waste) of garments. Renting and sharing clothing is also known as CFC (collaborative fashion consumption) but its environmental impact and mitigation of pollution are debated. While convenient for the consumer, reducing the number of items housed in the wardrobe, the environmental impact of rental may however not be reduced as much as advertised. Transportation between users and storage, dry-cleaning, and re-packaging causes more environmental impact than reselling or hand-me-downs. As noted by Levänen et al. (2021), the lowest global warming impacts are achieved be reducing consumption, followed by reusing and recycling, whereas rental services are likely to increase customers’ consumption, logistics, and use, making sharing and rental scenarios having the highest Global Warming Potential.

As noted by sustainability researcher Timo Rissanen, it is the total amount of clothing units in circulation that needs to be reduced, as well as their environmental impact during their life cycle, and rental services could, if improved, play a role in that.

Vintage and resale models 
The most sustainable fibers in fashion are the ones many people already have. Thus, to recirculate existing garments, new business models engage the resale, revival, and recirculation of used, second-hand or vintage clothing. Purchasing second-hand, or vintage clothing is a way to lower the amount of new clothing that gets produced and disposed of and ends up in landfills. 

Other resale models also contain elements of upcycling and repairs. Repairing and reselling used clothing has less environmental impact than creating, processing, dying, cutting, sewing, and shipping new clothing to the consumer.

Rethinking recycling 

A more technologically minded trend is "innovative recycling", which seeks to view waste itself as a source of value. Within the fashion industry, some manufacturers have created incentives for consumers to participate in the recycling of their clothing. Innovative recycling is also aimed at clothing stores themselves, who do not always have sustainable methods to properly dispose of boxes and plastic bags; innovative recycling also looks at the packaging that clothes come in having been sent from manufacturers. A change in approaches towards recycling within the fashion industry could potentially greatly impact the amount of waste the industry creates.

From collective to connective 
Using digital technologies and blockchain can promote more "Connected Clothes" which allows for more opportunities in digitalizing clothing for personalization, life-tracking, and traceability of its origin.

Tailored resurgence 
Tailored couture is another option for the future of a greener fashion industry, for those who can afford it, as it can potentially lead to less waste and more jobs improving the economy. Tailored couture is no longer desired because of the convenience of malls and stores provide but the consequence of the convenience is the pollution of the environment. The idea is that tailored clothing can reduce mass-production, while reusing and redesigning old clothes to fit could reduce the amount of old worn out unfitting clothes thrown out or given away.

Open-source fashion 
Open-source content has become a popular reference with designers sharing patterns and designs, connecting to the success of the open-source software movement. By sharing designs freely, using digital technology, the aim is to make consumers more engaged in the design, production, and lifetime use of the garment. While the terminology is new, the concept builds on the sharing of patterns across European courts in 16th century (such as Kleidungsbüchlein or Trachtenbuch (usually translated as "Book of Clothes") of Melchior Lorck, and the wide range of sewing magazines, such as Burda Style, in the early 20th century.  By making garments more open and adaptable across their lifecycle, the hope is that "garments can be multi-functional, beyond simply clothing our bodies; that fashion should be both useful and inventive; and that what we wear should relate to the world around us." Examples of open-source fashion range from freely available patterns and production techniques, platforms for exchanging materials and patterns, and maker spaces.

Technologies 

Novel technologies for virtual try-ons of clothes sold via e-commerce may enable more sustainable fashion and reduce wasted clothes and related transportation and production expenses.

Sustainable clothing 

Sustainable clothing refers to fabrics derived from eco-friendly resources, such as sustainably grown fiber crops or recycled materials. Sustainable clothing includes the use of second-hand retail repair and often utilizes upcycling and recycling of clothing. It also refers to how these fabrics are made. Historically, being environmentally conscious towards clothing meant (1), making clothes last long by caring for them, repairing and patching them, (2) inheriting and using hand-me-downs within ones expanded family and community, (3) buying clothes from thrift stores or any shops that sell second-hand clothing, or (4) donating used clothes to shops previously mentioned, for reuse or resale. In modern times, with a prominent trend towards sustainability and being 'green', sustainable clothing has expanded towards (5) reducing the amount of clothing overproduced, incinerated or discarded to landfills, and (6) decreasing the environmental impact of agrochemicals in producing conventional fiber crops (e.g. cotton).

Under the accordance of sustainability, recycled clothing upholds the principle of the "Three R's of the Environment": Reduce, Reuse, and Recycle, as well as the "Three Legs of Sustainability": Economics, Ecology, and Social Equity.

Through the utilization of recycled material for the manufacturing of clothing, provides an additional realm of economic world profit. Sustainable Clothing will provide a new market for additional job opportunities, the continuous net flow of money in the global economy, and the consumption reduction of raw materials and virgin resources. Source reduction or reducing the use of raw materials and virgin resources can ultimately reduce carbon emissions during the manufacturing process as well as the resources and carbon emissions that are related to the transportation process. This also prevents the unsustainable usage of extracting materials from the Earth by making use of what has already been used (i.e. recycling).

Sustainable clothing has many benefits. Some being that it uses less water, it reduces toxic waste, it reduces the amount of pesticides released into the environment, and the quality is higher.

Recycled clothing 

Recycled or reclaimed fibers are recovered from either pre or post-consumer sources. Those falling into the category of 'pre-consumer' are unworn/unused textile wastes from all the various stages of manufacture. Post-consumer textile waste could be any product that has been worn/used and has (typically) been discarded or donated to charities. Once sorted for quality and color, they can be shredded (pulled, UK, or picked, US) into a fibrous state. According to the specification and end-use, these fibers can be blended together or with 'new' fiber.

While most textiles can be recycled, they are mainly downgraded almost immediately into low-quality end-uses, such as filling materials. The limited range of recycled materials available reflects the market dominance of cheap virgin fibers and the lack of technological innovation in the recycling industry. For over 200 years recycling technology has stayed the same; fibers are extracted from used fabric by mechanically tearing the fabric apart using carding machines. The process breaks the fibers, producing much shorter lengths that tend to result in a low-quality yarn. Textiles made from synthetic fibers can also be recycled chemically in a process that involves breaking down the fiber at the molecular level and then depolymerizing the feedstock. While chemical recycling is more energy-intensive than mechanical pulling, the resulting fiber tends to be of more predictable quality. The most commonly available recycled synthetic fibre is polyester made from plastic bottles, although recycled nylon is also available.

In addition to promoting a sounder environment by producing newer clothing made with sustainable, innovative materials, clothing can also be donated to charities, sold into consignment shops, or recycled into other materials. These methods reduce the amount of landfill space occupied by discarded clothes. According to the United States Environmental Protection Agency's 2008 Report on Municipal Solid Waste (MSW), Generation, Recycling, and Disposal in the United States defines clothing as non-durable – generally lasts less than three years – textiles. In 2008, approximately 8.78 millions of tons of textiles were generated, 1.45 millions of tons were recovered and saved from landfills resulting in a rate of almost 17%. The EPA report also states that the amount of MSW being "Discarded" is 54%, "Recovered" is 33%, and "Combusted with Energy recovery" is 13%. Approximately two-thirds of clothing materials are sent to landfills, making it the fastest-growing component of waste in the household waste stream. , textiles disposed of in landfill sites have risen from 7% to 30% within the last five years.

Upcycling 
Upcycling in fashion signifies the process of reusing the unwanted and discarded materials (such as fabric scraps or clothes) into new materials or products without compromising the value and the quality of the used material. The definition of textile waste can be production waste, pre-consumer waste, and post-consumer waste.

Typically, upcycling creates something new and better from the old, used or disposed of items. The process of upcycling requires a blend of factors like environmental awareness, creativity, innovation, and hard work and results in a unique sustainable product. Upcycling aims at the development of products truly sustainable, affordable, innovative, and creative. For example, shirts can be upcycled into a value-added product like a unique handmade braided rug, whereas the opposite of upcycling is downcycling such as cleaning rags made from worn T-shirts.

Upcycling can be seen as one of the waste management strategies. There are different types of strategies. From least to most resource-intensive, the strategies are the reuse of product, repairing and reconditioning to keep products as long as possible, recycling the raw materials. The reuse of textile products 'as is' brings significant environmental savings. In the case of clothing, the energy used to collect, sort and resell second-hand garments in between 10 and 20 times less than that needed to make a new item.

It is meant to be innovative by making certain materials into something re-usable and improved, which gives companies and manufacturers higher values for their products. Recycling is a big factor in sustainability, so creating new materials to avoid mass pollution can help improve the economy. An example of a brand that does this is Ecoalf. All clothing items are made from recycled items like used tires and plastic bottles. The manufacturing of their items also takes place wherever the materials are recycled from, ultimately reducing their carbon footprint.

The advantages of circular fashion include: reduced dependency on imported raw materials, creation of eco- friendly industries and jobs, eco-friendly brands benefit from a better public image, and reduction in environmental damage caused by resource extraction. On the other hand, disadvantages include dependency on the consumer's actions, creating a new business model on the basis of recycled is tough, and the entire cycle requires integrating product life cycle from raw material to disposal.

Sustainable consumption practices for enhanced product life 
There are negative social and environmental impacts at all stages of the fashion product life: materials production and processing, manufacture of garments, retail and marketing, use and maintenance, and at the discard phase. For some products, the environmental impact can be greater at the use phase than material production, leading for instance to the suggestion to wash clothes less.

Consumer engagement

Consumer engagement challenges the "passive" mode of ready-to-wear fashion where consumers have few interfaces and little incentive to be active with their garments; to repair, change, update, swap, and learn from their wardrobe. This type of consumer engagement, aiming to promote fashion as an ability rather than primarily as a commodity, has been referred to as "fashion-ability." The term "folk fashion" has been used in the emphasis on craft engagements with garments where the community heritage of skills are in focus. There are currently many designers trying to find ways that experiment with new models of action that deposes passivity and indifference while preserving the positive social dynamics and sensibilities fashion offers, often in relation to Alvin Toffler's notion of the "prosumer" (portmanteau of producer and consumer). Notions of participatory design, open source fashion, and fashion hacktivism are parts of such endeavors, mixing techniques of dissemination with empowerment, reenchantment and Paulo Freire's "Pedagogy of the Oppressed." An example of such consumer engagement can be Giana Gonzalez and her project "Hacking Couture", which has tested such methods across the world since 2006. As highlighted in the research of Jennifer Ballie, there is also an increasing interest across industry to produce unique experiences amongst users, connecting co-design with social media apps and tools to enhance the user experience of consumers. A recent example has been the Open Source Fashion Cookbook, by the New York-based brand ADIFF, showing how consumers can recycle materials, share and modify patterns, and co-create more engaging forms of fashion consumption.

Enhancing the lifespan of products have been yet another approach to sustainability, yet still only in its infancy. Upmarket brands have long supported the lifespan of their products through product-service systems, such as re-waxing of classic outdoor jackets, or repairs of expensive handbags, yet more accessible brands do still not offer even spare buttons in their garments. One such approach concerns emotionally durable design, yet with fashion's dependency on continuous updates, and consumer's desire to follow trends, there is a significant challenge to make garments last long through emotional attachment. As with memories, not all are pleasant, and thus a focus on emotional attachment can result in favoring a normative approach to what is considered a good enough memory to manifest emotionally in a garment. Cultural theorist Peter Stallybrass approaches this challenge in his essay on poverty, textile memory, and the coat of Karl Marx.

Clothing swapping 

Clothing swapping can further promote the reduction, reuse, and recycling clothing. By reusing clothing that has already been made and recycling clothing from one owner to another, source reduction can be achieved. This moves away from usage of new raw materials to make more clothing available for consumption. Through the method of clothing swapping, an alternative resource for consumers to ultimately save in regards to money and time is provided. It reduces transportation emissions, costs, and the time it takes to drive and search through the chaos of most clothing stores. Swapping clothes further promotes the use of sustainable online shopping and the internet as well as an increase of social bonds through online communication or effective personal communication in "clothing swap parties." The EPA states, that by reusing items, at the source waste can be diverted from ending up in landfills because it delays or avoids that item's entry in the waste collection and disposal system.

Clothing donation to charities 
People can opt to donate clothing to charities. In the UK, a charity is a non-profit organization that is given special tax form and distinct legal status. A charity is "a foundation created to promote the public good".  People donating clothing to charitable organizations in America are often eligible for tax deductions, albeit the donations are itemized.

Examples of charitable organization 
The following is a list of few charitable organizations known for accepting clothing donations.

 Centre for Sustainable Fashion – an organization that focuses on projects that explore knowledge exchange, research, and education.
Goodwill Industries – a non-profit organization founded in 1902 in Boston. Originally started as an urban outreach.
 Oxfam – a non-profit organization founded in 1942 in Oxford. Originally established to mitigate famines in Greece caused by Allied naval blockades during World War II. Formerly Oxfam Committee for Famine Relief.
Responsibility in Fashion – a non-profit organization bringing together sustainable, conscious, ethical, and eco-fashion organizations and government programs toward the goal of energizing and bringing innovation to the growing movement toward clean, safe and ethical fashion.
Salvation Army – an Evangelical Christian-based non-profit organization founded in 1865 in London.
Textile Exchange – a non-profit organization that focuses on minimizing the detrimental effects of the garment and textile industry and maximizing sustainability efforts.
United Way Worldwide – a non-profit organization originally named Charity Organization Society, established in 1887 in Denver, Colorado. Currently a coalition of charitable organizations.
 Planet Aid - a non-profit organization founded in 1997.

Consignment 

A clothing consignment shop sells clothes that are owned not by the shop's owner but by the individual who had given (or consigned) the items to the shop for the owner to sell. The shop owner/seller is the consignee and the owner of the items is the consignor. Both the consignor and the consignee receive portions of the profit made from the item. However, the consignor will not be paid until the items are sold. Therefore, unlike donating clothing to charities, people who consign their clothes to shops can make a profit.

Textile recycling 

Charities keep approximately 10% of all the donated clothing received.  These clothes tend to be good quality, fashionable, and high valued fabrics that can easily be sold in charities' thrift shops. Charities sell the other 90% of the clothing donations to textile recycling firms.

Textile recycling firms process about 70% of the donated clothing into industrial items such as rags or cleaning cloths. However, 20–25% of the second-hand clothing is sold into an international market. Where possible, used jeans collected from America, for example, are sold to low-income customers in Africa for modest prices, yet most end up in landfill as the average US sized customer is several sizes bigger than the global average.

Sustainable fashion organizations and companies
There is a broad range of organizations purporting to support sustainable fashion, some representing particular stakeholders, some addressing particular issues, and some seeking to increase the visibility of the sustainable fashion movement. They also range from the local to global. It is important to examine the interests and priorities of the organizations.

Organizations 

Fashion Revolution is a not-for-profit global movement founded by Carry Somers and Orsola de Castro which highlights working conditions and the people behind the garments. With teams in over 100 countries around the world, Fashion Revolution campaigns for systemic reform of the fashion industry with a focus on the need for greater transparency in the fashion supply chain. Fashion Revolution has designated the anniversary of the Rana Plaza disaster in Bangladesh as Fashion Revolution Day. Fashion Revolution Week takes place annually during the week on which the anniversary falls. Over 1000 events take place around the world, with millions of people engaging online and offline. Fashion Revolution publishes the Fashion Transparency Index annually, ranking the largest fashion brands in the world on how much they disclose about their policies, practices, procedures and social and environmental impact.

 Red Carpet Green Dress, founded by Suzy Amis Cameron, is a global initiative showcasing sustainable fashion on the red carpet at the Oscars. Talent supporting the project includes Naomie Harris, Missi Pyle, Kellan Lutz and Olga Kurylenko.
 Undress Brisbane is an Australian fashion show that sheds light on sustainable designers in Australia.
 Global Action Through Fashion is an Oakland, California-based ethical fashion organization working to advocate for sustainable fashion.
 Ecoluxe London, a not-for-profit platform, supports luxury with ethos through hosting a biannual exhibition during London Fashion Week and showcasing eco-sustainable and ethical designers.
 The Ethical Fashion Initiative, a flagship program of the International Trade Centre, a joint agency of the United Nations Conference on Trade and Development (UNCTAD) and World Trade Organization, enables artisans living in urban and rural poverty to connect with the global fashion chain. The Initiative also works with the rising generation of fashion talent from Africa, encouraging the forging sustainable and fulfilling creative collaborations with artisans on the continent. The Ethical Fashion Initiative is headed by Simone Cipriani.

Companies 
Eco Age, a consultancy company specializing in enabling businesses to achieve growth and add value through sustainability, is an organization that promotes sustainable fashion. Its creative director, Livia Firth, is also the founder of the Green Carpet Challenge which aims to promote ethically made outfits from fashion designers.
Trans-America Trading Company is one of the biggest of about 3,000 textile recyclers in the United States. Trans-America has processed more than 12 million pounds of post-consumer textiles per year since 1942.  At its 80,000-square-foot sorting facility, workers separate used clothing into 300 different categories by type of item, size, and fiber content. About 30% of the textiles are turned into absorbent wiping rags for industrial uses, and another 25–30% are recycled into fiber for use as stuffing for upholstery, insulation, and the manufacture of paper products.
ViaJoes – Sustainable clothing manufacturer producing eco-friendly fabrics from recycled cotton and other sustainable products confirmed to GOTS – Global Organic Textile Standard International Working Group standard

Materials 

In fashion, the consideration of sustainability of materials is critical. The renewability and source of a fiber, the process of how a raw fiber is turned into a textile, the impact of preparation and dyeing of the fibers, energy use in production and preparation, the working conditions of the people producing the materials, and the material's total carbon footprint, transportation between production plants, chemicals used to keep shipments fresh in containers, shipping to retail and consumer, how the material will be cared for and washed, the processes of repairs and updates, and what happens to it at the end of life. The indexing of the textile journeys is thus extremely complex. In sustainability, there is no such thing as a single-frame approach. Issues dealt with in single frames will almost by definition lead to unwanted and unforeseen effects elsewhere.

Overall, diversity in the overall fiber mix is needed; in 2013 cotton and polyester accounted for almost 85% of all fibers, and thus their impacts were, and continue to be, disproportionately magnified. Also, many fibers in the finished garments are mixed to acquire desired drape, flexibility or stretch, thus affecting both care and the possibility to recycle the material in the end.

Cellulose fibers
Natural fibers are fibers which are found in nature and are not petroleum-based. Natural fibers can be categorized into two main groups, cellulose or plant fiber and protein or animal fiber. Uses of these fibers can be anything from buttons to eyewear such as sunglasses.

Other than cotton, the most common plant-based fiber, cellulose fibers include: jute, flax, hemp, ramie, abaca, bamboo (used for viscose), soy, corn, banana, pineapple, beechwood (used for rayon). Alternative fibers such as bamboo (in yarn) and hemp (of a variety that produces only a tiny amount of the psychoactive component found in cannabis) are coming into greater use in so-called eco-fashions. Bacterial cellulose is currently being tested and better developed as a new fiber alternative. These are the type of fibers that are made out of bacteria, yeasts, and other microorganisms that spins cellulose during the fermentation process. This material is easy for fashion designers to use because it compresses while drying, knits itself while evaporating, and take little to no effort to color.

Cotton 

Cotton, also known as vegetable wool, is a major source of apparel fiber. Celebrated for its excellent absorbency, durability, and intrinsic softness, cotton accounts for over 50% of all clothing produced worldwide. This makes cotton the most widely used clothing fiber. Up to 1 billion people worldwide depend on the cotton industry for their livelihoods, including 100 million smallholder farmers.

Cotton is one of the most chemical-intensive crops in the world. Conventionally grown cotton uses approximately 25% of the world's insecticides and more than 10% of the world's pesticides. However, growing and processing this particular fiber crop is largely unsustainable. For every pound of cotton harvested, a farmer uses up 1/3 lb of chemical, synthetic fertilizer.  As a whole, the US cotton production makes up 25% of all pesticides deployed in the United States. Worldwide, cotton takes up 2.4% of all arable lands yet requires 16% of the world's pesticides.  The cotton hulls contain the most potent insecticide residues. They are often used as cattle feed, which means that consumers are purchasing meat containing a concentration of pesticides. The processing of cotton into usable fibers also adds to the burden on the environment. Manufacturers prefer cotton to be white so that cotton can easily be synthetically dyed to any shade of color. Natural cotton is actually beige-brown, and so during processing, manufacturers would add bleach and various other chemicals and heavy metal dyes to make cotton pure white. Formaldehyde resins would be added in as well to form "easy care" cotton fabric.

Bt cotton 

To reduce the use of pesticides and other harmful chemicals, companies have produced genetically modified (GMO) cotton plants that are resistant to pest infestations. Among the GMO are cotton crops inserted with the Bt (Bacillus thuringiensis) gene. Bt cotton crops do not require insecticide applications. Insects that consume cotton containing Bt will stop feeding after a few hours, and die, leaving the cotton plants unharmed.

As a result of the use of Bt cotton, the cost of pesticide applications decreased between $25 and $65 per acre.  Bt cotton crops yield 5% more cotton on average compared to traditional cotton crops.  Bt crops also lower the price of cotton by 0.8 cents per pound.

However, there are concerns regarding Bt technology, mainly that insects will eventually develop resistance to the Bt strain. According to an article published in Science Daily, researchers have found that members from a cotton bollworm species, Helicoverpa zea, were Bt-resistant in some crop areas of Mississippi and Arkansas during 2003 and 2006. Fortunately, the vast majority of other agricultural pests remain susceptible to Bt.

Micha Peled's documentary exposé Bitter seeds on BT farming in India claimed to reveal the true impact of genetically modified cotton on India's farmers, with a suicide rate of over a quarter-million Bt cotton farmers since 1995 due to financial stress resulting from massive crop failure and the exorbitantly high price of Monsanto's proprietary BT seed, although the evidence doesn't support this claim as the suicide rate of Indian famers has decreased since the introduction of Bt cotton. The film also refutes false claims purported by the biotech industry that Bt cotton requires less pesticide and empty promises of higher yields, as farmers discover the bitter truth that in reality, Bt cotton in fact requires a great deal more pesticide than organic cotton, and often suffer higher levels of infestation by Mealybug resulting in devastating crop losses, and extreme financial and psychological stress on cotton farmers.  Due to the biotech seed monopoly in India, where Bt cotton seed has become the ubiquitous standard, and the organic seed has become absolutely unobtainable, thus coercing all cotton farmers into signing Bt cotton seed purchase agreements which enforce the intellectual property interests of the biotech multinational corporation Monsanto.

Organic cotton 

Organic cotton is grown without the use of any genetic modification to the crops, without the use of any fertilizers, pesticides, and other synthetic agro-chemicals harmful to the land. All cotton marketed as organic in the United States is required to fulfill strict federal regulations regarding how the cotton is grown. This is done with a combination of innovation, science, and tradition in order to encourage a good quality of life and environment for all involved. Organic cotton uses 88% less water and 62% less energy than conventional cotton.

Naturally colored cotton 

Cotton is naturally grown in a variety of colors. Typically, cotton color can come as mauve, red, yellow, and orange hues. The use of naturally colored cotton has long been historically suppressed, mainly due to the industrial revolution.  Back then, it was much cheaper to have uniformly white cotton as a raw source for mass-producing cloth and fabric items.  Currently, modern markets have revived a trend in using naturally colored cotton for its noted relevance in reducing harmful environmental impacts. One such example of markets opening to these cotton types would be Sally Fox and her Foxfiber business—naturally colored cotton that Fox has bred and marketed.  On an additional note, naturally colored cotton is already colored, and thus do not require synthetic dyes during process. Furthermore, the color of fabrics made from naturally colored cotton does not become worn and fade away compared to synthetically dyed cotton fabrics.

Soy 

Soy fabrics are derived from the hulls of soybeans—a manufacturing byproduct. Soy fabrics can be blended (i.e. 30%) or made entirely out of soy fibers. Soy clothing is largely biodegradable, so it has a minimal impact on environment and landfills. Although not as durable as cotton or hemp fabrics, soy clothing has a soft, elastic feel.  Soy clothing is known as the vegetable cashmere for its light and silky sensation. Soy fabrics are moisture absorbent, anti-bacterial, and UV resistant. However, soy fabrics fell out of public knowledge during World War II, when rayon, nylon, and cotton sales rose sharply.

Hemp 

Hemp, like bamboo, is considered a sustainable crop. It requires little water to grow, and it is resistant to most pests and diseases. The hemp plant's broad leaves shade out weeds and other plant competitors, and its deep taproot system allows it to draw moisture deep in the soil. Unlike cotton, many parts of the hemp plant have a use. Hemp seeds, for example, are processed into oil or food.  Hemp fiber comes in two types: primary and secondary bast fibers. Hemp fibers are durable and are considered strong enough for construction uses. Compared to cotton fiber, hemp fiber is approximately 8 times the tensile strength and 4 times the durability.

Hemp fibers are traditionally coarse and have been historically used for ropes rather than for clothing. However, modern technology and breeding practices have made hemp fiber more pliable, softer, and finer.

Bamboo 

Bamboo fabrics are made from heavily pulped bamboo grass.  Making clothing and textile from bamboo is considered sustainable due to the lack of need for pesticides and agrochemicals. Naturally disease and pest resistant, bamboo is also fast growing. Compared to trees, certain varieties of bamboo can grow 1–4 inches long per day, and can even branch and expand outward because of its underground rhizomes. Like cotton fibers, bamboo fibers are naturally yellowish in color and are bleached white with chemicals during processing.

Kombucha (SCOBY) 

Furnished by a grant from the US. Environmental Protection Agency, associate professor Young-A Lee and her team are growing vats of gel-like film composed of cellulose fiber, a byproduct of the same symbiotic colonies of bacteria and yeast (abbreviated SCOBY) found in another of the world's popular "live culture" foods: kombucha. Once harvested and dried, the resulting material has a look and feel much like leather. The fibers are 100 percent biodegradable, they also foster a cradle-to-cradle cycle of reuse and regeneration that leaves behind virtually zero waste. However, this material takes a long time to grow about three to four weeks under lab-controlled conditions. Hence mass production is an issue. In addition, tests revealed that moisture absorption from the air softens this material makes it less durable. Researchers also discovered that cold conditions make it brittle.

Other cellulose fibers 
Other alternative biodegradable fibers being developed by small companies include:

 leather alternative using pineapple leaves;
 bio-composites, fabrics, and leather alternative using various parts of coconut;
 fabric and paper made from banana plant stalks and stems.
 garmets made from tencel fibers.

Protein fibers
Protein fibers originate from animal sources and are made up of protein molecules. The basic elements in these protein molecules being carbon, hydrogen oxygen and nitrogen. Natural protein fibers include: wool, silk, angora, camel, alpaca, llama, vicuna, cashmere, and mohair.

Wool 
Just as in cotton production, pesticides are conventionally used in the cultivation of wool, although quantities are considerably smaller, and it is thought that good practices can significantly limit negative environmental impacts. Sheep are treated either with injectable insecticides, a pour-on preparation or dipped in a pesticide bath to control parasite infections, which if left untreated can have serious health implications for the flock. When managed badly, these pesticides can cause harm to human health and aquatic ecosystems both on the farm and in subsequent downstream processing.

Silk 
Most commercially produced silk is of the cultivated variety and involves feeding the worms a carefully controlled diet of mulberry leaves grown under special conditions. Selected mulberry trees are grown to act as homes for the silkworms. The fibers are extracted by steaming to kill the silk moth chrysalis and then washed in hot water to degum the silk. The silk fiber is known for its strength and is considered a prestigious fiber. Its use in textiles is limited due to its high cost. Most silkworms used to produce silk are not harmed in the process and are grown in their natural habitat, essentially "free range". The silk industry also employs millions of people in rural China.

Cashmere 
Cashmere is obtained from the fine, soft hairs of a cashmere goat's underbelly coat. This specific breed of goat is found throughout Asia. Due to the rarity of the breed, four goats are needed to produce enough cashmere for one sweater. Initially, cashmere was relatively expensive, but due to increased demand, the industry is beginning to take a toll on animals and the land. More and more goats are needed which results in more mouths to feed. Overpopulation of the goats degrades the land due to increased grazing. The cashmere industry is becoming more and more controversial with the questioning of the working conditions of goat herders and the underpaying of farmers. Oxfam reported in Spring 2021 on a project in Afghanistan being undertaken jointly with the Burberry Foundation and PUR Projet, working with goat farmers to improve their business operations and make the Afghan cashmere industry more sustainable.

Other natural materials

MuSkin 
Italian company Zero Grado Espace has developed MuSkin, an alternative to leather made from the cap of the phellinus ellipsoideus mushroom, a parasitic fungus that grows in subtropical forests. It is water repellent and contains natural penicillin substances which limit bacteria proliferation.

Wild rubber 
Wild Rubber, developed by Flavia Amadeu and Professor Floriano Pastore at the University of Brazil, is an initiative that promotes wild rubber material which comes from the sap or latex of the pará rubber tree that grows within a biodiverse ecosystem in the Amazon Rainforest, Acre, Brazil. It is tapped by local communities who typically have a close relationship the forest and will gather medicinal plants or wild food during their tapping rounds.

Qmilk 
Qmilch GmbH, a German company has innovated a process to produce a textile fiber from casein in milk but it cannot be used for consumption. Qmilk fiber is made from 100% renewable resources. In addition, for the production of 1 kg of fiber Qmilch GmbH needs only 5 minutes and max. 2 liters of water. This implies a particular level of cost efficiency and ensures a minimum of  emissions. Qmilk fiber is biodegradable and leaves no traces. In addition, it is naturally antibacterial, especially against the bacterial strains, Staphylococcus aureus and Pseudomonas aeruginosa and is ideal for people that suffer from textile allergies.

Fabrics made from Qmilk fiber provide high wearing comfort and a silky feel. The organic fiber is tested for harmful substances and dermatologically tested for the wearer's skin and body compatibility 0% chemical additives.

Manufactured fibers
Manufactured fibers sit within three categories: Manufactured cellulosic fibers, manufactured synthetic fibers and manufactured protein fiber (azlon). Manufactured cellulosic fibers include modal, Lyocell (also known under the brand name Tencel), rayon/viscose made from bamboo, rayon/viscose made from wood and polylactic acid (PLA). Manufactured synthetic fibers include polyester, nylon, spandex, acrylic fiber, polyethylene and polypropylene (PP). Azlon is a manufactured protein fiber. Rayon/ viscose is a fiber out of pulp highly used in fast fashion as it is cheaply manufactured. To extract rayon/viscose, plantations cut down 30% of endangered and ancient forests threatening the life of ecosystems.

PET plastic 

PET plastics are also known as Polyethylene terephthalate(PETE). PET's recycling code, the number within the three chasing arrows, is one. These plastics are usually beverage bottles (i.e. water, soda, and fruit juice bottles). According to the EPA, plastic accounts for 12% of the total amount of waste we produce. Recycling plastic reduces air, water, and ground pollution. Recycling is only the first step; investing and purchasing products manufactured from recycled materials is the next of many steps to living sustainably.

Clothing can be made from plastics. Seventy percent of plastic-derived fabrics come from polyester, and the type of polyester most used in fabrics is polyethylene terephthalate (PET). PET plastic clothing come from reused plastics, often recycled plastic bottles. The Coca-Cola Company, for example, created a "Drink2Wear" line of T-shirts made from recycled bottles. Generally, PET plastic clothing are made from recycled bottles as follows: plastic bottles are collected, compressed, baled, and shipped into processing facilities where they will be chopped into flakes, and melted into small white pellets. Then, the pellets are processed again, and spun into yarn-like fiber where it can be made into clothing. One main benefit of making clothes from recycled bottles is that it keep the bottles and other plastics from occupying landfill space. Another benefit is that it takes 30% less energy to make clothes from recycled plastics than from virgin polyesters.

Fungal species
Alexander Bismarck and Mitchell Jones from the University of Vienna have conducted research on the possibility of using fungal species to create sustainable leather alternatives. Leather alternatives can be produced by using byproducts of agricultural products such as sawdust. The sawdust acts as a feedstock for the growth of fungal mycelium. After a few weeks, the fungal bacteria can be processed and chemically treated into a leather-like material. The researchers state that these fungal biomasses exhibit similar material and tactile properties as authentic leather.  Using fungal biomass to create a leather alternative is sustainable as the entire process is carbon neutral and all the materials are completely biodegradable when they are done being used.

Production 
Whereas many producers have since the turn of the century been striving for a cradle-to-cradle model of production, or a circular economy, there has so far been no successful example of fully sustainable production, as there is environmental impact from all extractive production practices (in processes of material production, dying, assembly, accessorizing, shipping, retail, washing, recycling etc.) There are many small initiatives towards change, yet so far, all these incremental improvements have been drowned by the explosive popularity of "fast" fashion and its economy of extraction, consumption, waste.

Producers
The global political economy and legal system supports a fashion system that enables fashion that has devastating environmental, social, cultural and economic impacts to be priced at a lower price than fashion which involves efforts to minimize harm in the growth, manufacturing, and shipping of the products. This results in higher prices for fashion made from reduced impact materials than clothing produced in a socially and environmentally damaging way (sometimes referred to as conventional methods).

Innovative fashion is being developed and made available to consumers at different levels of the fashion spectrum, from casual clothing to haute couture which has a reduced social and environmental impact at the materials and manufacture stages of production and celebrities, models, and designers have recently drawn attention to socially conscious and environmentally friendly fashion.

3D seamless knitting 
3D seamless knitting is a technology that allows an entire garment to be knit with no seams. This production method is considered a sustainable practice due to its reduction in waste and labor. By only using the necessary materials, the producers will be more efficient in their manufacturing process. This production method is similar to seamless knitting, although traditional seamless knitting requires stitching to complete the garment. In contrast 3D seamless knitting creates the entire garment, eliminating additional work. The garments are designed using 3D software unlike traditional flat patterns. Shima Seiki and Stoll are currently the two primary manufacturers of the technology. The technology is produced through the use of solar energy, and they are selling to brands like Max Mara.

Zero waste 
Zero waste design in fashion is a concept that aims to reduce material waste throughout the textile and fashion production process. Although the concept has existed for a number of years on the grounds of reducing costs through reducing waste, zero waste design is increasingly being integrated into fashion production for environmental reasons. Zero-waste pattern making designs patterns for a garment so that when the pattern pieces are cut, no fabric is wasted.

Dyeing 

Traditional methods of dyeing textiles are incredibly harmful towards the earth's water supply, creating toxic chemicals that affect entire communities. An alternative to traditional water dyeing is sc dyeing (super critical carbon dioxide). This process creates no waste by using 100% of the dyes, reducing energy by 60% with no auxiliary chemicals, and leaving a quarter of the physical footprint of traditional dyeing. Different names for this process are Drydye and Colordry. Another company called Colorep has patented Airdye, a similar process that they claim uses 95% less water and up to 86% less energy than traditional dyeing methods.

Comparison websites and ecolabels 
No brand is considered by environmental experts to be fully sustainable, and controversy exists over exactly how the concept of sustainability can be applied in relation to fashion, if it can be used at all, or if labels such as "slow" and "sustainable" fashion are inherently an oxymoron. Brands that sell themselves as sustainable often lack systems to deal with oversupply, take back used clothes, fully recycle fibers, offer repair services, or even support the life of the garment during use (such as instructions on washing, care and repair). Almost no brands offer replacement parts, such as buttons, straps or pockets, for their garments.

Some comparison websites exist which compare fashion brands on their sustainability record, which give some indication to consumers about the sustainability of their products.

There are many ecolabels in existence which focus on textile goods.
Some notable ecolabels include:
 EU Ecolabel
 Fair Trade Certified
 Global Organic Textile Standard
 Oeko-Tex Standard 1000

Sustainable textile brands
Some brands that sell themselves as sustainable are listed below;

 Eastern European prisoners are designing sustainable prison fashion in Latvia and Estonia under the Heavy Eco label, part of a trend called "prison couture".
 Other sustainable fashion brands include Elena Garcia, Nancy Dee, By Stamo, Outsider Fashion, Beyond Skin, Oliberté, Hetty Rose, DaRousso, KSkye the Label, and Eva Cassis.
 The brand Boll & Branch make all of their bedding products from organic cotton and have been certified by Fair Trade USA.
The Hemp Trading Company is an ethically driven underground clothing label, specializing in environmentally friendly, politically conscious street wear made of hemp, bamboo, organic cotton and other sustainable fabrics.
 Patagonia, a major retailer in casual wear, has been selling fleece clothing made from post-consumer plastic soda bottles since 1993.
Everlane, a brand that offered the customer a full breakdown of how much it would cost to make each product, from the price of the raw materials and transportation to exactly how much of a markup Everlane would take.
Pact, a brand that produced Fair Trade Factory Certified™ clothing made out of organic cotton.
People Tree is a brand that actively supports farmers, producers and artisans through 14 producer groups, in 6 countries. They are a part of the WFTO community and a representative of Fair Trade.
Wrangler, a historic denim brand, launched a sustainable denim collection called Indigood that uses foam instead of water to dye denim, resulting in 100 per cent less water used, and 60 per cent less energy used.
Big Frenchies is a French-inspired brand that produces sustainable clothing made in USA with GOTS-certified organic cotton.

Designers 
There is no certain stable model among the designers for how to be sustainable in practice, and the understanding of sustainability is always a process or a work-in-progress, and varies by who defines what is "sustainable;" farmers or animals, producers or consumers, managers or workers, local businesses or neighborhoods. Thus critical scholars would label much of the business-driven discourse on sustainability as "greenwashing" as under the current economic paradigm, "sustainability" is primarily defined as keeping the wheels of perpetual production and consumption turning; to keep the "perpetuum mobile" of fashion running and in perpetual motion.

There are some designers that experiment in making fashion more sustainable, with various degrees of impact;
Ryan Jude Novelline created a ballroom gown constructed entirely from the pages of recycled and discarded children's books known as The Golden Book Gown that "prove[d] that green fashion can provide as rich a fantasia as can be imagined."
 Eco-couture designer Lucy Tammam uses eri silk (ahimsa/peace silk) and organic cotton to create her eco friendly couture evening and bridal wear collections.
Amal Kiran Jana is a designer from India and the founder of Afterlife Project which is a sustainability development project supporting global and unique designers in 360 degrees.
 Stella McCartney pushes the agenda for sustainable fashion that is animal and eco-friendly. She also uses her name and her brand as a platform to push for a greener fashion industry. The brand uses the EP&L tool which was created to help companies understand their environmental impact by measuring greenhouse gas emissions, land use, water use, water pollution, air pollution and waste across the entire global supply chain.

Controversies
A question at the foundation of sustainable fashion concerns exactly what is to be "sustained" of the current model of fashion. Controversies thus emerge what stakeholder agendas should be prioritized over others. There is also the associated concern of how to curb the practice of greenwashing on one hand, ad also ensure that firms that promote such practices are subject to increased scrutiny and criticism on the other.

Marketing controversies 
The increase in western consumers' environmental interest is motivating companies to use sustainable and environmental arguments solely to increase sales. Because environmental and sustainability issues are complex, it is also easy to mislead consumers. Companies can use sustainability as a “marketing ploy” something that can be seen as greenwashing. Greenwashing is the deceptive use of an eco-agenda in marketing strategies. It refers mostly to corporations that make efforts to clean up their reputation because of social pressure or for the purpose of financial gain. Companies continuing to using greenwashing in turn hurts companies that are true to their environmental goals, losing their competitive edge to bigger corporations.

Greenwashing 

A major controversy on sustainable fashion concerns how the "green" imperative is used as a cover-up for systemic labor exploitation, social exclusion and environmental degradation, what is generally labelled as greenwashing. Market-driven sustainability can only address sustainability to a certain degree as brands still need to sell more products in order to be profitable. Thus almost any initiative towards addressing ecological and social issues still contributes to the damage. In a 2017 report, the industry projects that the overall apparel consumption will rise by 63%, from 62 million tons today to 102 million tons in 2030, thus effectively erasing any environmental gains made by current initiatives. As long as the business models of fashion brands are based on growth as well as production and sales of high quantities of garment, almost all initiatives from the industry remain labelled as greenwashing.

Materials controversies 
Though organic cotton is considered a more sustainable choice for fabric, as it uses fewer pesticides and chemical fertilizers, it remains less than 1% global cotton production. Hurdles to growth include cost of hand labor for hand weeding, reduced yields in comparison to conventional cotton and absence of fiber commitments from brands to farmers before planting seed. The up front financial risks and costs are therefore shouldered by the farmers, many of whom struggle to compete with economies of scale of corporate farms.

Though some designers have marketed bamboo fiber, as an alternative to conventional cotton, citing that it absorbs greenhouse gases during its life cycle and grows quickly and plentifully without pesticides, the conversion of bamboo fiber to fabric is the same as rayon and is highly toxic. The FTC ruled that labeling of bamboo fiber should read "rayon from bamboo". Bamboo fabric can cause environmental harm in production due to the chemicals used to create a soft viscose from hard bamboo. Impacts regarding production of new materials make recycled, reclaimed, surplus, and vintage fabric arguably the most sustainable choice, as the raw material requires no agriculture and no manufacturing to produce. However, these are indicative of a system of production and consumption that creates excessive volumes of waste.

Donation bin controversy 
There are "charities" that are actually for-profit organizations. These organizations are often multibillion-dollar firms that keep profits accrued from selling donated clothing. Monetary donations are given for public goodwill, but only at relatively few percentages. Such organizations often use drop-off boxes to collect clothes. These drop-off boxes look similar to their non-profit counterparts, which mislead the public into donating their clothes to them. Such public deception prompted backlash, such as when the mayor of Sedro-Woolley called for the city's removal of for-profit clothing donation bins. Organisations such as Charity Navigator aim to provide people with a way of discerning how trustworthy a charity's activities are before they donate time, money or goods.

Second-hand controversies 
Used clothing is sold in more than 100 countries. In Tanzania, used clothing is sold at Mitumba markets (Swahili for "bundles"). Most of the clothing is imported from the United States. However, there are concerns that trade in secondhand clothing in African countries decreases development of local industries even as it creates employment in these countries. While the reuse of materials brings resource savings, there are some concerns that the influx of cheap, second-hand clothing, particularly in Africa, has undermined indigenous textile industries, with the result that clothing collected in the West under the guise of 'charitable donations' could actually create more poverty. The authors of Recycling of Low Grade Clothing Waste warn that in the long run, as prices and quality of new clothing continue to decline, the demand for used clothing will also diminish.

Future of fashion sustainability 
In the European Union, the Registration, Evaluation, Authorization and Restriction of Chemicals (REACH) regulations required in 2007 that clothing manufacturers and importers identified and quantified the chemicals used in their products.

On May 3, 2012, the world's largest summit on fashion sustainability was held in Copenhagen, gathering more than 1,000 key stakeholders in the industry to discuss the importance of making the fashion industry sustainable. Copenhagen Fashion Summit has since then gathered thousands of people from the fashion industry in their effort to create a movement within the industry.

In July 2012, the Sustainable Apparel Coalition launched the Higg Index, a self-assessment standard designed to measure and promote sustainable supply chains in the apparel and footwear industries. Founded in 2011, the Sustainable Apparel Coalition is a nonprofit organisation whose members include brands producing apparel or footwear, retailers, industry affiliates and trade associations, the U.S. Environmental Protection Agency, academic institutions and environmental nonprofits. The Global Change Award, is an innovation challenge created by the H&M foundation. It created a trend report in 2017 to look at the future of sustainable fashion.

In 2019, the UK Parliament's Environment Audit Committee published a report and recommendations on the future of fashion sustainability, suggesting wide-ranging systemic change, not least government regulation and tax-incentives for sustainable practices, such as lowered VAT for repair services. The report highlights the need for wide political and social changes to push the fashion industry towards more sustainable practices and levels of consumption, with the goal of "less harm" being too low to be of any helpful consequence. The report finishes:

Retailers must take responsibility for the social and environmental cost of clothes. They should use their market power to demand higher environmental and labour standards from suppliers. Offering rental schemes, lifetime repair and providing the consumer with more information about the sourcing and true cost of clothing are all measures that can be more widely adopted. Shifting business practice in this way can not only improve a business' environmental and social impact but also offer market advantage as they respond to the growing consumer demand for responsible, sustainable clothing.

This study investigates the challenges associated with implementing sustainability in fashion design by identifying the perceptions, attitudes, and involvement of fashion design practitioners in sustainability. Both design and designer roles are key to inspiring sustainable design practices; their role can contribute to sustainability by shaping design production practices and influencing consumption processes.

See also
Ecodesign
Pollution in the fashion industry
Reusable shopping bag
Trashion
Product tracing systems, which allow consumers to see the source factory of a product
Fashion activism
Textile industry#Industry process

References

Further reading

 Black, Sandy (2008). Eco-chic : the fashion paradox, London: Black Dog. . .
 Black, Sandy (2013). The sustainable fashion handbook,  New York: Thames & Hudson. . .
 
 
 
 
 
 
 
 Shell, Hanna Rose (2020). Shoddy : From Devil's Dust to the Renaissance of Rags. Chicago: University of Chicago Press. .

Fashion
Clothing and the environment
Fashion
Slow movement
Sustainable development
Sustainability
Environmental economics